Danny Hilman Natawidjaja is an Indonesian geologist who is an expert in earthquake geology and geotectonics at the Indonesian Institute of Sciences (LIPI) Research Center for Geotechnology.

Together with Kerry Sieh, his doctoral supervisor at the California Institute of Technology, Natawidjaja's name is known for his papers "Neotectonics of the Sumatran Fault, Indonesia" (2000) and "Paleo Geodesy of the Sumatra Subduction Zone" (2004). In Indonesia, Natawidjaja has contributed to research on local tectonic plates.  Since 2000, he has made predictions regarding the earthquake on the west coast of Sumatra Island.

Education
Natawidjaja graduated with a BSc degree in geology from the Bandung Institute of Technology (Indonesia) in 1984. He then went to the University of Auckland (New Zealand) where he obtained an MSc degree (with Honors) in Geology in 1992. Finally, he went to the California Institute of Technology (Caltech, United States) where he earned a PhD in Geology in 1998, with a thesis focussing on neotectonics and earthquake studies.

Career
Natawidjaja became the initiator and coordinator of earthquake research at LIPI in 2002. With grants, he pioneered and developed a continuous network of SuGAr GPS stations since 2002 to monitor tectonic movements in Sumatra in collaboration with Caltech USA and the Earth Observatory of Singapore.

He became the head of the national team for the preparation of Guidelines for Natural Disaster Risk Analysis (PARBA) organized by UNDP and BNPB in 2008–2009.

He initiated and developed a Postgraduate program in Earthquake Studies at ITB known as the Graduate Research in Earthquake and Active Tectonics (GREAT) Program which was funded by the Australian-Indonesia Facility for Earthquake Disaster Reduction (AIFDR) bilateral program 2010–2017.

In 2011, he took a leading part in the controversial geological survey of the archeological site at Gunung Padang as chief geologist of the government-sponsored  (TTRM, 'Integrated and Independent Research Team').

He became Chair of the Geology Working Group of the National Earthquake Study Center (PuSGeN) since 2016 to revise the Seismic Hazard Map of Indonesia which was then published by the Ministry of PUPR in 2017 and referred to by SNI 1726–2019 to replace the previous SNI.

In 2018, Natawidjaja was cited in multiple media articles about the July 2018 Lombok earthquake and aftershocks.

Awards
Sarwono Prawirohardjo Award from the Indonesian Institute of Sciences (2005);
Satyalancana Karya Satya X Year (1999), Satyalancana Karya Satya XX Year (2008) and Satyalancana Karya Satya XXX Year (2017) from the President of the Republic of Indonesia.

Bibliography

Selected journal articles

References

Further reading

External links

1961 births
Living people
Bandung Institute of Technology alumni
California Institute of Technology alumni
Indonesian geologists
Indonesian scientists
People from West Java
University of Auckland alumni
Atlantis proponents